The 1920 United States Senate election in Washington was held on November 2, 1920. Incumbent Republican U.S. Senator Wesley Livsey Jones was re-elected to a third term in office over Farmer-Labor nominee Clemens J. France and former Seattle mayor George F. Cotterill.

Blanket primary

Candidates

Democratic
George F. Cotterill, former Mayor of Seattle

Republican
Frank Erickson
Forest L. Hudson
W.M. Inglis
Wesley Livsey Jones, incumbent Senator since 1909

Results

General election

Candidates
 George F. Cotterill, former Mayor of Seattle (Democratic)
 Clemens J. France, former president of the Municipal League of Seattle and brother of U.S. Senator from Maryland Joseph I. France (Farmer-Labor)
 Wesley Livsey Jones, incumbent U.S. Senator since 1908 (Republican)

Results

See also 
 1920 United States Senate elections

References 

1920
United States Senate
Washington